Brendan Shinnimin (born January 7, 1991) is a Canadian professional ice hockey centre playing for Luleå HF of the Swedish Hockey League (SHL). He has previously played for the Arizona Coyotes of the National Hockey League (NHL).

Playing career
Shinnimin played junior hockey for the Tri-City Americans of the Western Hockey League (WHL). Shinnimin was the WHL's leading scoring for the 2011–12 WHL season with 134 points, earning him the 2012 Bob Clarke Trophy.  He not only led the WHL in scoring, but was the leading scorer in the entire Canadian Hockey League. He won the Four Broncos Memorial Trophy in 2012 as the WHL Player of the Year and was a unanimous pick as a Western Conference first team all-star.  He ended his junior career with a 38-game point scoring streak, beginning on February 3, 2012, during which he scored 83 points.  In 2010-11, he was named a WHL second-team all-star. He would also be awarded the CHL Player of the Year award as the best overall player in the CHL.

On October 19, 2010, Shinnimin was given a 12-game suspension - the longest in that league over the past four seasons – for his "dangerous hit-from-behind" which resulted in a concussion and a bruised back for Josh Nicholls of the Saskatoon Blades.  In 2009, he played for Team WHL in the Subway Super Series against a team of Russian junior all-stars.

Shinnimin was not drafted in the NHL Entry Draft.  On March 2, 2012, the Phoenix Coyotes of the National Hockey League signed Shinnimin as a free-agent to a three-year entry-level contract.

Following the 2014–15 NHL season Shinnimin became a restricted free agent under the NHL Collective Bargaining Agreement. The Arizona Coyotes  made him a qualifying offer to retain his NHL rights and, on July 5, 2015, Shinnimin filed for Salary Arbitration.

On July 14, 2016, Shinnimin agreed to a one-year contract with the SCL Tigers of the National League A (NLA). He made his NLA debut on September 9, 2016 at the PostFinance Arena against Canton rival, SC Bern. On December 21, 2016, the Tigers released Shinnimin after having appeared in only 12 games out of 32. Later that month, he inked a deal with Barys Astana of the Kontinental Hockey League (KHL).

Following three successful seasons in the Swedish Hockey League with the Växjö Lakers, Shinnimin opted to extend his European career by moving to German club, Adler Mannheim of the DEL, on a one-year contract for the 2020–21 season on September 4, 2020.

Career statistics

Awards and honours

References

External links

1991 births
Living people
Adler Mannheim players
Arizona Coyotes players
Barys Nur-Sultan players
Canadian ice hockey centres
Canadian expatriate ice hockey players in Switzerland
Canadian expatriate ice hockey players in Sweden
Luleå HF players
Portland Pirates players
SCL Tigers players
Springfield Falcons players
Tri-City Americans players
Undrafted National Hockey League players
Växjö Lakers players